Union Bank of Taiwan (UBOT) is a bank in Taiwan. It is headquartered in Taipei and employs 3,628 people.

Forbes states that Union Bank of Taiwan is a "medium-size lender", and is controlled by its founder, the billionaire Lin Rong-San.

History
The preparatory office for the bank was set up on 29 March 1989 and the bank commenced its business on 21 January 1992.

References

Banks of Taiwan
Taiwanese companies established in 1992
Banks established in 1992